The Pet Parade is the ninth studio album by Fruit Bats, released on March 5, 2021, via independent record label Merge Records.

Track listing

References 

2021 albums
Fruit Bats (band) albums
Merge Records albums